Notable people with the surname Hirschowitz include:
Basil Hirschowitz
Gabé Hirschowitz

See also 
Alexander–Hirschowitz theorem
Horowitz (disambiguation)

Surnames